
Gmina Olsztyn is a rural gmina (administrative district) in Częstochowa County, Silesian Voivodeship, in southern Poland.

The gmina contains part of the protected area called Eagle Nests Landscape Park.

Villages
Gmina Olsztyn contains the villages and settlements of Biskupice, Bukowno, Krasawa, Kusięta, Olsztyn, Przymiłowice, Przymiłowice-Podgrabie, Skrajnica, Turów and Zrębice.

Neighbouring gminas
Gmina Olsztyn is bordered by the city of Częstochowa and by the gminas of Janów, Kamienica Polska, Mstów, Poczesna, Poraj and Żarki.

References

Olsztyn
Częstochowa County